The Claro River (Portuguese, Rio Claro) is a river of Goiás state in central Brazil. It is a tributary of the Paranaíba River, which it enters just downriver of São Simão Dam.

See also
 List of rivers of Goiás
 Tributaries of the Río de la Plata

References

Brazilian Ministry of Transport

Rivers of Goiás